The men's 500 m speed skating competition for the 2002 Winter Olympics was held in Salt Lake City, Utah, United States. The competition consisted of two separate 500 metre races, with the competitors ranked by their cumulative time from the two races.

Favorite Jeremy Wotherspoon fell in the first heat, taking him out of contention, but posted the fastest time in the second heat. Casey FitzRandolph became  the first American to win the event since Eric Heiden in 1980.

Records

Prior to this competition, the existing world and Olympic records were as follows.

500 meters (1 race)

The following new world and Olympic records were set during this competition.

Results

References

Men's speed skating at the 2002 Winter Olympics